Kisumu Town constituency was an electoral constituency in Kisumu County, Kenya (1963-1996) and was disestablished before the General Election of 1997.

Members of Parliament

References  

Populated places in Kenya
Constituencies of Kenya